Sannikovo is a rural locality (a village) in Borisoglebskoye Rural Settlement, Muromsky District, Vladimir Oblast, Russia. The population was 58 as of 2010. There are 3 streets.

Geography 
Sannikovo is located 13 km north of Murom (the district's administrative centre) by road. Stepankovo is the nearest rural locality.

References 

Rural localities in Muromsky District